Brandworkers is a non-profit organization of food factory workers building a union with the Industrial Workers of the World. Through co-workers uniting, food factory workers are organizing to win dignified jobs and build power across the industry. Based in New York City, Brandworkers was founded in 2007 by a group of retail and food employees engaged with workers' rights issues. Brandworkers trains workers in the use of social change tools to achieve employer compliance with the law and improve working conditions.

Issues
Brandworkers campaigns and services are focused on the issues of wage theft, including minimum wage & overtime; immigrant labor; employment discrimination; occupational health & safety; workers compensation; and the right to organize.

Campaigns
Brandworkers has assisted workers organizing against wage theft and discrimination at food manufacturing companies and warehouses, including campaigns at Wild Edibles, Pur Pac and Flaum Appetizing, winning a number of settlements over unpaid wages.

See also

 The New York Foundation
 Industrial Workers of the World

References

External links
Brandworkers Website

Workers' rights organizations based in the United States
Legal advocacy organizations in the United States
Community organizations
Trade unions affiliated with the Industrial Workers of the World
Organizations established in 2007
Non-profit organizations based in New York City
Progressive International